Pep is an unincorporated community in northwestern Hockley County, Texas, United States, situated along Farm to Market Road 303. It is located on the high plains of the Llano Estacado just to the west of the historic Yellow House Ranch.  Pep has a post office with the ZIP code 79353.

Education
Public education in the community of Pep is provided by the Morton Independent School District. The Pep Independent School District consolidated with neighboring Whiteface in August 1978. Sometime in the 1990s Morton ISD took over the operation of the school and made it an accelerated alternative educational center.

See also
Bula
Eastern New Mexico
Needmore
Whitharral

References

4. http://lubbockonline.com/local-news/2014-11-27/pep-natives-return-home-cook-serve-thanksgiving-meal

External links

Photos of West Texas and Eastern New Mexico

Unincorporated communities in Hockley County, Texas
Unincorporated communities in Texas